Mary Mwakapila  (born 5 June 1995) is a Zambian footballer who plays as a midfielder for the Zambia women's national football team. She was part of the team at the 2014 African Women's Championship. On club level she played for Bauleni Sports Academy in Zambia.

International goals
Scores and results list Zambia's goal tally first

References

1995 births
Living people
Zambian women's footballers
Zambia women's international footballers
Place of birth missing (living people)
Women's association football midfielders